The twenty-first season of Law & Order, an American police procedural and legal drama, was ordered by NBC on September 28, 2021, over a decade after its original cancellation on May 24, 2010. The season began airing on February 24, 2022, as a mid-season replacement during the 2021–2022 broadcast season. Due to such status, the season consists of only 10 episodes. In May 2022, the series was renewed for a twenty-second season.

Anthony Anderson and Sam Waterston returned in their roles of Kevin Bernard and Jack McCoy, respectively; and were joined by new cast members Jeffrey Donovan, Camryn Manheim, Hugh Dancy and Odelya Halevi. Series creator Dick Wolf returned as an executive producer, while Rick Eid was named showrunner. The series is produced by Wolf Entertainment and Universal Television.

Cast and characters

Main
 Anthony Anderson as Senior Detective Kevin Bernard
 Jeffrey Donovan as Junior Detective Frank Cosgrove 
 Camryn Manheim as Lieutenant Kate Dixon
 Hugh Dancy as Executive Assistant District Attorney Nolan Price
 Odelya Halevi as Assistant District Attorney Samantha Maroun
 Sam Waterston as District Attorney Jack McCoy

Crossover stars from Law & Order: Special Victims Unit 

 Mariska Hargitay as Captain  Olivia Benson
 Terry Serpico as Chief Tommy McGrath

Recurring
 Shayvawn Webster as Detective Dani Vertiz
 Milica Govich as Judge Leanne Dreben
 Marsha Stephanie Blake as Attorney Erica Knight
 Lawrence Arancio as Judge Desmond
 Michael Beach as Attorney Brian Harris

Notable guests
 Carey Lowell as Assistant District Attorney Jamie Ross
 Dylan Baker as Sanford Remz

Episodes

Production

Development
The prospect of reviving Law & Order for a twenty-first season first came about in the more immediate wake of cancellation, with talks falling through with TNT and AMC. In February 2015, it was reported that NBC was eyeing a limited series of 10 episodes. However, it never made it to active development. In July 2021, NBC scrapped Law & Order: For the Defense, a planned spinoff in the franchise they had ordered straight to series the previous May, and scheduled to lead a Thursday schedule entirely occupied by the franchise, with Special Victims Unit and Organized Crime. It was stated at the time that in its stead new spinoffs were being developed. On September 28, 2021, NBC officially renewed the show. Despite being billed as a twenty-first season, NBC gave it the same "straight to series" order they gave For the Defense, as it is typically used only for new series. Series creator Dick Wolf returned as an executive producer. Wolf signed an overall deal with NBC and Universal Television in 2020 that will keep him at the network through 2025. In December 2019, Wolf had asked former showrunner Rene Balcer to return to run the show again, but Balcer declined. Wolf then asked other former Law & Order show runners to take the helm, but they also declined. Finally, Rick Eid, who was an executive producer and the incumbent showrunner on Chicago P.D. and FBI, which share a fictional universe with the Law & Order franchise, all of which are produced by Wolf Entertainment and Universal Television, stepped down as showrunner of Chicago P.D. to take over showrunning duties of Law & Order. Eid became an executive producer during the season and retains that role on Chicago P.D. as well. Arthur Forney and Peter Jankowski will also serve as executive producers. Production on the season began on December 8, 2021. On May 10, 2022, the series was renewed for a twenty-second season.

Casting
On November 1, 2021, Jeffrey Donovan was cast as a series regular to portray a New York Police Department detective. At that time it was also reported that Sam Waterston and Anthony Anderson, who starred in earlier seasons of the series, and additional former cast members were also in talks to return. Waterston previously stated in 2015 that he would be open to returning. Other previous cast members S. Epatha Merkerson, Jeremy Sisto and Alana de la Garza hold starring roles on Chicago Med and FBI, series that both exist within the same fictional universe and are produced by Wolf Entertainment. On November 23, 2021, it was announced that Hugh Dancy had been cast as an Assistant District Attorney and that Anderson had signed a one-year deal to return as Detective Kevin Bernard. On December 10, 2021, it was revealed that Camryn Manheim had been cast as Lieutenant Kate Dixon, the successor to Merkerson's character Lieutenant Anita Van Buren. Manheim portrayed minor characters in previous seasons of the series.  On December 15, 2021, Odelya Halevi was announced to be joining the cast as Assistant District Attorney Samantha Maroun. A day later, Waterston was announced to have finalized a one-year deal to return as District Attorney Jack McCoy. Anderson was confirmed not to be continuing beyond his one year on May 26, 2022.

Carey Lowell who portrayed Jamie Ross from 1996 to 2001, and crossed over into Trial by Jury, appeared as a guest star in the season premiere. Dylan Baker also appeared as Sanford Rems, a character he played from 2004 to 2006. Mariska Hargitay made a guest appearance as her SVU character, Olivia Benson, in the season finale.

Release
When first announced it was unclear whether the season would air in the 2021–22 or 2022–23 television season; it was later reported that it would premiere as a mid-season replacement on February 24, 2022. It airs in the 8 PM Thursday timeslot that For the Defense had been scheduled for, alongside SVU and Organized Crime,

References

2022 American television seasons
21